Navitalai Senilagakali  (1952–2006) was a Fijian rugby union footballer. He played as a Fly Half and represented Lautoka. He was renowned for kicking a penalty resulting in the ball flying above the goal post gaining them 3 points. That same ball flew above the spectators, above the stadium in Argentina and also above the soldiers on guard on top of the Ferrocarril Oeste, Buenos Aires Stadium.

Senilagakali had 32 caps for Fiji, scoring 20 tries, 80 points in aggregate. His first cap came on the 24 May 1980, in a 9-22 loss to Australia, and his final match was on 9 November 1985, in a 3-40 loss to Wales.

In 1994 he retired following a shoulder dislocation while playing for the Lautoka in the Benson & Hedges Cup back in his homeland.

1952 births
2006 deaths
Fiji international rugby union players
Sportspeople from Lautoka
I-Taukei Fijian people